Ida Eléonora Davida von Schulzenheim (1859–1940) was a Swedish painter. Her foremost motif was paintings of animals.

Biography
Ida von Schulzenheim was born 8 January 1859 in Stora Skedvi to landowner baron David T. von Schulzenheim and Ida Sophia Cederborgh. She studied at the Royal Swedish Academy of Arts, and from 1888 in Paris under Julien Dupré, Jules Joseph Lefebvre and Benjamin Constant. She was given an honorary mention at the world's exhibit in Paris 1889, a silver medal in Amiens in 1890, a gold medal in Stockholm in 1891, an honorary mention in Paris in 1892.

von Schulzenheim exhibited her work at the Palace of Fine Arts at the 1893 World's Columbian Exposition in Chicago, Illinois.

She also served as its first chairperson. She founded the society to give female artists, who she felt were discriminated against and not given as much attention and opportunities as their male colleagues, a better possibility to be known and appreciated for their art, and not to actually draw the attention to their gender as such: 
"You do not actually think, that we female artists would wish to become known merely for being women? I mean, would we wish to exhibit by ourselves, unless we were forced to?"

Ida von Schulzenheim was given the Litteris et Artibus in 1927. She died on 24 April 1940 in Stockholm.

Gallery

References

Further reading

External links

 Riksarkivet Föreningen Svenska Konstnärinnor och Ida von Schulzenheim
 Ida von Schulzenheim, Intervju i Idun 1889

1859 births
1940 deaths
19th-century Swedish painters
20th-century Swedish painters
19th-century Swedish women artists
20th-century Swedish women artists
Litteris et Artibus recipients